Kiryat Shmona (lit. Town of the Eight) is a city in the Northern District of Israel on the western slopes of the Hula Valley near the Lebanese border. The city was named after the eight people, including Joseph Trumpeldor, who died in 1920 defending Tel Hai.

Located near the Israel–Lebanon border, Kiryat Shmona is Israel's northernmost city.

History
The town of Kiryat Shmona was established in 1949 on the site of the former Palestinian village al-Khalisa, whose inhabitants had fled after Safed was taken by the Haganah during the 1948 Arab–Israeli War and an attempt by the village to come to an agreement with the Jewish authorities was rejected. Literally The town of the Eight, Kiryat Shmona was named after eight Jewish militiamen, commanded by Joseph Trumpeldor, who had fallen in the 1920 Battle of Tel Hai during the Franco-Syrian War adjacent to the new town. It had originally been named Kiryat Yosef for Trumpeldor before the name was changed to Kiryat Shmona in June 1950.

Initially the empty houses of Khalisa were used as a transit camp for Jewish immigrants and refugees who worked mainly in farming. It was called Kiryat Yosef after Joseph Trumpeldor. The first residents were fourteen Yemenite Jews who arrived on July 18, 1949, and were followed by more Yemenite Jews a month later. By July 1951, the population had grown to nearly 4,000. Relationships with nearby kibbutzim were often strained.

In 1953, Kiryat Shmona was declared a development town. In the first few years, growth was driven by the arrival of immigrants from Yemen and Romania, but later on, waves of immigrants from North Africa, in particular from Morocco, arrived. The city was built without a master plan, but rather neighborhood by neighborhood as waves of immigrants arrived.

Kiryat Shmona's location close to the Lebanon makes it a target for rocket fire cross-border attacks.

On April 11, 1974, the Popular Front for the Liberation of Palestine – General Command, sent three members across the border from Lebanon to Kiryat Shmona. They killed eighteen residents of an apartment building, including many children, before being killed in an exchange of fire at the complex, which became known as the Kiryat Shmona massacre.

The city continued to be the target of attacks, including Katyusha rocket attacks by the PLO in July 1981, a Katyusha rocket attack by the PLO in March 1986 (killing a teacher and injuring four students and one adult), and further Katyusha rocket attacks by Hezbollah during 1996's Operation Grapes of Wrath.

On 24/25 June 1999 two residents were killed when Hezbollah fired a salvo of Katusha rockets into the centre of Kiryat Shimona. They were the first fatalities in a cross border attack since 1995 and came during massive Israeli air strikes across Lebanon which caused $52 million damage and killed eleven Lebanese.

In spite of attacks from Lebanon, the population grew from 11,800 in 1972 to 15,100 in 1983.

In 2000–2006, the locals enjoyed relative peace but suffered from loud explosions every few weeks because of Hezbollah anti-aircraft cannons fired at IAF planes flying across the Israeli-Lebanese border.

During the 2006 Lebanon War, the city was again the target of Hezbollah Katyusha rocket attacks. Most of the city's residents left the area during the war, and the 5,000 who remained stayed in bomb shelters, turning the city into a ghost town. During the war, a total of 1,012 Katyusha rockets hit Kiryat Shmona.

Geography

The city is located above the Dead Sea Transform fault, and as a result, is one of the cities in Israel most at risk to earthquakes (along with Safed, Beit She'an, Tiberias, and Eilat).

Demographics

According to CBS, in 2001 the ethnic makeup of the city was 97.9% Jewish and other non-Arabs, without a significant Arab population. In 2001 there were 121 immigrants. The Jewish population of the town is largely of Sephardi and Mizrahi heritage, and many are industrial workers employed in local small industry and in neighboring kibbutzim.

According to CBS, in 2001 there were 10,800 males and 10,700 females. The population of the city was spread out, with 33.5% 19 years of age or younger, 19.8% between 20 and 29, 19.3% between 30 and 44, 15.3% from 45 to 59, 3.5% from 60 to 64, and 8.5% 65 years of age or older. The population growth rate in 2001 was 1.8%.

Economy
According to CBS, as of 2000, in the city there were 8,303 salaried workers and 467 are self-employed. The mean monthly wage in 2000 for a salaried worker in the city is 4,306 shekels, a real change of 4.6% over the course of 2000. Salaried males have a mean monthly wage of 5,443 shekels (a real change of 7.1%) versus 3,065 shekels for females (a real change of −2.2%). The mean income for the self-employed is 6,769. There are 564 people who receive unemployment benefits and 1,655 people who receive an income guarantee.

The  economy is based on consumer-oriented products such as communications, information technology, and electronics as well as agriculture on the surrounding lands and tourism.

Tourism
The town has a cable car link with Manara above in the Naftali mountain range and also is home to an activity center and toboggan run located in the south of the town.

In the residential area there is an urban natural space called Park HaZahav. Zahav means "gold" in Hebrew; the park is named after the stream running through it – Ein Zahav Stream – the source of which is Ein Zahav ("golden spring"). Park HaZahav covers 11 hectares in the middle of the city. It comprises many diverse natural resources. In addition to intensive activity areas designated for leisure and play, and open to all, the park contains a diverse, protected, natural area comprising Ein Zahav Stream and HaTachanot Stream (Tachanot refers to two water mills [tachana=mill] which were active along this stream in the past), which flow through the middle of the park. These streams have created different aquatic habitats, including shallow sections, rapids, deep sections and pools that support diverse riparian vegetation that has developed with time into a riparian forest. This isn't common in Israel. The park has a trail that goes through the forest and along the stream. Included in the park are different gardening initiatives by local volunteers, a picnic area, and a playground. The park is used for educational purposes by the community.

Education and religious institutions

According to CBS, there are 12 schools and 4,339 students in the city. They are spread out, as 9 elementary schools and 2,355 elementary school students, and 6 high schools and 1,984 high school students. 49.3% of 12th grade students were entitled to a matriculation certificate in 2001.

The Tel-Hai Academic College is a college located near Kibbutz Kfar Giladi and north of Kiryat Shmona. The college offers academic and continuing education programs for approximately 4,500 students, 70 percent of whom come from outside the Galilee. Minorities comprise about 10 percent of the student body. The college offers degrees in life sciences, social sciences, computer science and the humanities.

Rabbi Zephaniah Drori serves as the Chief Rabbi of Kiryat Shmona as well as heading the Kiryat Shmoneh Hesder Yeshivah.

Health care

Kiryat Shmona has an urgent care clinic with an emergency room that serves the city and nearby communities. It provides services in the areas of surgery, internal medicine, orthopedics, trauma, neurology, gynecology, and psychiatry. There are also a few outpatient clinics located in the city.

Sports
Kiryat Shmona is the smallest city in Israel with a top flight football club, Hapoel Ironi Kiryat Shmona. Formed by a merger of Hapoel Kiryat Shmona and Maccabi Kiryat Shmona in 2000, the club won promotion to the top division for the first time at the end of the 2006–07 season, and won the Israeli Premier League Championship in 2011–2012.

The town is home to one of the 14 Israel Tennis Centers (ITC). These Centers throughout Israel teach children life skills through tennis. The Centers are primarily funded through donations. The Israel Children's Centers in the United States, and the Canada Israel Children's Centres are largely responsible for the funding of the Tennis Centers, which strive to never turn a child away due to financial need.

Transportation

Kiryat Shmona is located at the junction of two major national highways, Highway 90 and Highway 99. Kiryat Shmona is located near the Northern terminus of the North-South Highway 90. Highway 90, "Israel's longest road", connects Eilat in the extreme south of the Country, running along Jordan Valley and the Dead Sea, running through the Occupied West Bank, to Kiryat Shmona in the northern extreme. The highway terminates about 8 km further north, at the Lebanese border at the town of Metula. Highway 99, Israel's northern-most East-West Highway, starts from Kiryat Shmona and travels East, into the occupied Golan. The highway passes the depopulated Syrian village of Banias, and connects to the occupied Druze Syrian town of Mas'ade. The highway also serves an important tourist function, as it provides access for Israelis to winter sport facilities at the slopes of Mount Hermon.

The Egged Bus Company provides services along 26 inner city bus routes in Kiryat Shmona. Egged Bus Company, along with Nateev Express, connect Kiryat Shmona to the surrounding Jewish and Arab localities. "Golan Public Transport" connects Kiryat Shmona to Jewish and Syrian Arab localities in the occupied Golan Heights. Egged Bus Company also provides long-distance services to cities such as Tel Aviv and Jerusalem in the center of the country.

Currently, Kiryat Shmona is not served by Israel Railways or any other sort of rail transport. There is an approved project to extend the Acre-Karmiel passenger rail line to Safed and Kiryat Shmona. The finalized plan was submitted for review in June 2022. The rail line will connect Kiryat Shmona to Safed (Tzahar), Karmiel, Haifa, and further south to the economic and population core of the Country at Gush Dan (Greater Tel Aviv). The rail line project itself has been subject to criticism. One criticism involves accusation of discrimination in planning against  Arab citizens of Israel, specifically that despite being a rail line in the Galilee, a region where more than half the population are Palestinian-Arab, no stations that will serve any of the Arab localities of the region is proposed. Same situation exists along the existing Acre-Karmiel portion of the line. Furthermore, residents of Palestinian villages along the path of the railway line, specifically residents of the village of Nahf, charge that the proposed route of the railway line to Kiryat Shmona will result either in confiscation, or in imposition of a construction ban on 10% of the land area of the village, a village that is overcrowded and has a limited development space as it is. In addition, there are also criticisms with respect to the proposed placement of Kiryat Shmona Train Station. The station is proposed to be located outside of the urban area of the city, along local road "9779". A large parking space is proposed for the station as well. However, critics state that the location of the station will force the residents to either continue to rely on their private vehicles, or to the inconvenience of waiting for urban bus lines as opposed to simply walking.

Notable people

 Vladislav Bykanov (born 1989), Olympic speed skater
 Zephaniah Drori (born 1937), Chief Rabbi of Kiryat Shmona
 Ido Kozikaro (born 1978), basketball player
 Dudi Sela (born 1985), tennis player
 Yifat Shasha-Biton (born 1973), educator and politician
 Artem Tsoglin (born 1997), pair skater
 Ofer Yaakobi (born 1961), basketball player
 Eden Ben Zaken (born 1994), singer
 Ronald Zilberberg (born 1996), Olympic figure skater

Twin towns

Kiryat Shmona is twinned with:

 Hampstead, Quebec, Canada (since 1978)
 Nancy, France (since 1984)
 Memmingen, Germany (since 2009)
 Rishon LeZion, Israel (since 2006)

References

External links

 Places To Visit in Kiryat Shmona (English)

Cities in the Great Rift Valley
Development towns
1949 establishments in Israel
Cities in Northern District (Israel)
Populated places established in 1949